Arthur St. Clair Lyon (August 1, 1876 – June 13, 1952) was an American fencer. He won a bronze medal in the team foil event at the 1920 Summer Olympics.

He died at Saint John's Hospital in Santa Monica, California on June 13, 1952, and was buried at Warwick Cemetery in Warwick, New York.

References

External links
 

1876 births
1952 deaths
American male foil fencers
Fencers at the 1920 Summer Olympics
Fencers at the 1924 Summer Olympics
Fencers at the 1928 Summer Olympics
Olympic bronze medalists for the United States in fencing
Sportspeople from New York City
Medalists at the 1920 Summer Olympics